Parliamentary elections were held in Togo on 4 March 1990, with a second round on 18 March in eight constituencies. The country was a one-party state at the time, with the Rally of the Togolese People as the sole legal party. The election won contested by 230 candidates running for 77 seats. Voter turnout was 78.7%.

Results

References

Togo
1990 in Togo
Elections in Togo
One-party elections
March 1990 events in Africa